This is a list of geographical features in the state of Rhineland-Palatinate, Germany.

Mountains 

 Eifel
 Hunsrück
 Palatinate forest
 Taunus
 Westerwald

Rivers 

See list

Lakes 

Franzosenwoog
Laacher See
Wiesensee

Castles 

See list

Miscellaneous 

 Palatinate

Cities 

See List of cities in Germany

Rhineland-Palatinate
Rhineland-Palatinate-related lists